Joe & The Juice (stylized in all caps) is a Danish chain of juice bars and coffee shops around the world. As of 2022 it has over 338 locations globally in Europe, Asia, and Australia with 64 locations in North America. The restaurants serve predominantly coffee, juice, and sandwiches.

History
Joe & The Juice was founded in 2002 by Kaspar Basse, at the time in his late 20s. The company is based in Copenhagen, Denmark. It sells coffee, tea, sandwiches, fresh juices, smoothies, and veggie shots made with organic ingredients.

In 2013, Valedo Partners bought the company for $48 million, though Basse retained a 10 percent stake. General Atlantic invested in October, 2016, to help fund expansion into the United States.

Although Joe & The Juice competes with both coffee shops like Starbucks and stores like Jamba Juice, Basse has tried to develop a different atmosphere at the restaurants, opting instead for what has been described as an "edgier" vibe. Managers are generally given autonomy over their stores.

In 2022, CEO Thomas Noroxe mentioned that they would expand over the Middle East, starting with Qatar and Dubai, followed by Saudi Arabia, Kuwait, Bahrain and Oman. He also suggested the use of franchise stores to expand into Mexico and China.

Locations
In addition to locations throughout Scandinavia, Joe & The Juice has locations in the San Francisco Bay Area, Los Angeles, Chicago, Miami, Pittsburgh, Seattle, Washington, D.C., Vancouver International Airport, New York City, and Minneapolis-St Paul International Airport. Across Europe it has locations in Reykjavik; Antwerp; London, Oxford, Birmingham, Liverpool, Stansted Airport and Nice; Lucerne, Zurich, The Hague, Amsterdam and nearby Amstelveen, Rotterdam, Hamburg; as well as in Hong Kong, Singapore, Seoul, and Sydney. In the Middle East, it has locations in Dubai and Riyadh.

See also
 List of coffeehouse chains
 Juice bar

References

External links
 

2002 establishments in Denmark
Companies based in Copenhagen
Coffeehouses and cafés
Companies based in Copenhagen Municipality